John Faber (October 22, 1952) is a former member of the Kansas House of Representatives, who represented the 120th district. He served from 1997 to 2011. The Kansas Chapter of Americans for Prosperity gave him an evaluation of 90 on fiscally conservative issues.

Faber has been involved with a number of community organizations, including the Brewster Co Op Board, Compassionate Friends, Goodland Co Op Board, and Lutheran Parish of Western Kansas.

Committee membership
Appropriations
Agriculture and Natural Resources Budget (Chair)
Transportation and Public Safety Budget
Joint Committee on Administrative Rules and Regulations

Major donors
The top 5 donors to Faber's 2008 campaign:
1. Kansas Medical Society $750 	
2. Kansas Assoc of Insurance Agents $600 	
3. National Rifle Association $500 	
4. Kansas Chamber of Commerce & Industry $500 	
5. Koch Industries $500

References

External links
Kansas Legislature - John Faber
Project Vote Smart profile
Kansas Votes profile
State Surge - Legislative and voting track record
Campaign contributions: 1998,2002, 2006, 2008

Republican Party members of the Kansas House of Representatives
Living people
1952 births
20th-century American politicians
21st-century American politicians